This is a list of private and public schools in the Buffalo, New York, metropolitan area.

Best High Schools in the Buffalo, NY Area 
Looking for high schools in the Buffalo, New York, area? The Buffalo area ranking contains schools from Cheektowaga and the city itself.

For personalized and effective admissions consulting, Get one-on-one advising on your essays, application strategy, and extracurricular profile to help you gain acceptance to your dream colleges.

Here are the Best High Schools in the Buffalo, NY Area 

 City Honors School at Fosdick Masten Park
 Williamsville East High School
 Clarence Senior High School
 East Aurora High School
 Williamsville South High School
 Williamsville North High School
 Lewiston Porter Senior High School
 Hamburg High School

City Honors School at Fosdick Masten Park 
186 E North St, Buffalo, New York

Overview of City Honors School at Fosdick Masten Park 
City Honors School follows designated teaching practices to ensure students have direction and receive continuous feedback. Student participation in community service and volunteer opportunities is strongly encouraged at this International Baccalaureate school. The school offers a specialized science research program where students complete laboratory internships and graduate with a special diploma authorized by City Honors School and their research institutions. Advanced Placement and/or Regents courses are available at every grade level.

City Honors School at Fosdick Masten Park 2022 Rankings 
City Honors School at Fosdick Masten Park is ranked #234 in the National Rankings. Schools are ranked on their performance on state-required tests, graduation and how well they prepare students for college. Read more about how we rank the Best High Schools.

All Rankings 

 #234
 #26
 #1
 #1

Over all total Score - 98.69%

SCORECARD 

 88%  Took at Least One AP® Exam
 74%  Passed at Least One AP® Exam
 94%  Mathematics Proficiency
 87%  Reading Proficiency
 88%  Science Proficiency
 96%  Graduation Rate

Amherst, New York

 The Park School of Buffalo, a progressive, prekindergarten through grade 12 independent day school in Amherst founded in 1912 by one of John Dewey's students.

Catholic schools 
 Buffalo Academy of the Sacred Heart

Jewish schools 
 Kadimah Jewish Day School

Colleges
 Bryant & Stratton College
 Daemen College
 Erie Community College - North campus
 Medaille College - Branch campus
 University at Buffalo - North campus
 D'Youville College

Athol Springs, New York

Saint Francis High School

Hamburg, New York
Immaculata Academy 
Frontier Central School District
Hamburg Central School District

Colleges
 Hilbert College

Kenmore, New York

Mount Saint Mary Academy

Lancaster, New York
St. Mary's High School

Orchard Park, New York

Colleges
 Bryant & Stratton College
 Erie Community College - South campus

Tonawanda, New York
 
Cardinal O'Hara High School

West Seneca, New York

Colleges
Houghton College

References

Education in Buffalo, New York